The Ledbury is a restaurant located on Ledbury Road, Notting Hill, London, England. It held two Michelin stars from 2010 until 2020, when it lost them as they shut due to Covid-19 restrictions being impractical for the restaurant, making it ineligible for assessment by Michelin inspectors. It has also been featured in S.Pellegrino World's 50 Best Restaurants. The head chef is Brett Graham, and he has been received favorably by critics. The restaurant reopened in February 2022, after being closed for almost 2 years.

History
The restaurant opened in 2005, under head chef Brett Graham. It is the sister restaurant of The Square, a two-Michelin-starred restaurant in Mayfair, London, with the same backers investing in both restaurants. The new restaurant gained a Michelin star within a year of opening, but sales only increased by 2009. A second Michelin star followed in 2010. Also in 2010, it was awarded the Square Meal BMW Restaurant of the Year Award.

Amid the ongoing COVID-19 pandemic, Graham announced in June 2020 that the restaurant would remain closed indefinitely, citing one-metre social distancing measures in place as impractical to keep staff and customers safe. Due to its closure, The Ledbury lost its Michelin stars in January 2021.

The Ledbury was refurbished and then reopened to the public in early February 2022. Its seating capacity was reduced from 55 to 45 in favor of a centre table to be used by the serving staff.

Reception
Giles Coren visited the restaurant for The Times''' shortly after it opened. He described it as having a "hushed, moneyed feel" Terry Durack also reviewed the restaurant during 2005, for The Independent on Sunday. He described the restaurant as "seriously good", and thought it was off to a "very good start".

In 2008, Matthew Norman, writing in The Guardian, commented on its "recession-resistant prices" and gave it 9.25 out of 10. Jasper Gerard ate at the restaurant for The Daily Telegraph in 2010, describing some courses as "scrumptious", but he felt that the dessert options were a let down compared to the rest of the dishes on offer.Harden's restaurant guide describes the food at The Ledbury as "genius" and scores the food as a one, service as a one and ambience as a two. It uses a scale of one to five, where one is high and five is low.

Awards
 The Ledbury became 2014 one of the Top Ten Restaurants in S.Pellegrino World's 50 Best Restaurants.
 The restaurant held two stars in the Michelin Guide  until 2020.
2012, S.Pellegrino World's 50 Best Restaurants in its second year listed, and was the highest climber on the list. 
 In both 2010 and 2011 The Ledbury was voted the UK's top restaurant in Restaurant Magazine's 'National Restaurant Awards'. 
 In 2011, it was also voted the best restaurant in London by Zagat, Harden's and the Sunday Times''.

Chef and co-restaurateur
The restaurant's chef de cuisine Brett Graham was born in Newcastle, New South Wales, in 1979. He worked as an apprentice of a fish restaurant Scratchleys. Then at age 18, he moved to a Sydney restaurant Banc. He immigrated to London in early 2000s after winning the Josephine Pignolet Young Chef of the Year Award in Sydney. He had previously worked at The Square as a sous chef for three and a half years under its chef de cuisine, Phil Howard. Graham won the Young Chef of the Year in 2002 from the Restaurant Association.

References

External links 
 

2005 establishments in the United Kingdom
2020 disestablishments in the United Kingdom
2022 establishments in the United Kingdom
Buildings and structures in Notting Hill
Michelin Guide starred restaurants in the United Kingdom
Restaurants disestablished during the COVID-19 pandemic
Restaurants disestablished in 2020
Restaurants established in 2005
Restaurants established in 2022
Restaurants in London